The 1913–14 Bucknell Bison men's basketball team represented Bucknell University during the 1913–14 NCAA men's basketball season. The head coach was D. Schaffner, coaching the Bison in his first season.The Bison's team captain was D. Schaffner.

Schedule

|-

References

Bucknell Bison men's basketball seasons
Bucknell
Bucknell
Bucknell